Sir Heneage Finch (15 December 1580 – 5 December 1631) was an English nobleman, lawyer, Member of Parliament, and politician who sat in the House of Commons at various times between 1607 and 1626. He was Speaker of the English House of Commons in 1626.

Early life
Finch was born on 15 December 1580 at The Moat, his father's house near Canterbury.  He was the fifth of seven sons of Sir Moyle Finch, 1st Baronet (–1614) and the former Elizabeth Heneage (1556–1634). Among his siblings were Theophilus, Thomas and Francis Finch. His sister Anne was a noted writer who married Sir William Twysden and his sister Catherine married Sir John Wentworth, 1st Baronet of Gosfield.

He was the second to be named after his maternal grandfather, and godparent, Sir Thomas Heneage, the Chancellor of the Duchy of Lancaster and Vice-Chamberlain of the Household.  His paternal grandfather was Sir Thomas Finch, the prominent military commander.

After his father's death in 1614, his mother, Lady Finch, was elevated to the peerage in her own right as Viscountess Winchilsea in 1623 and was further honoured when she was made Countess of Winchilsea in 1628. His mother died in 1634 and was succeeded by his elder brother Thomas, who had already succeeded their eldest brother Theophilus in the baronetcy.

He matriculated into Trinity College, Cambridge in about 1592, along with his elder brother Thomas, and was awarded B.A. in 1596.

Career
He was admitted at Inner Temple in 1597 and called to the bar in 1606.  In December 1607, Finch was elected a Member of Parliament for Rye in a by-election following the death of sitting Member, Thomas Hamon. His return was secured by his brother-in-law (Sir William Twysden), who used his influence to obtain a letter of recommendation from Henry Howard, 1st Earl of Northampton. Parliament was in recess, however, so Finch was unable to take his seat until February 1610. He was not returned to Parliament and in 1614 was replaced by Edward Hendon. 

After he left Parliament, Finch entered the service of Prince Charles.  Through Charles, Finch was nominated by the duchy of Cornwall for a parliamentary seat at Helston in December 1620.  William Noy obtained the seat, however, the duchy found him an alternative place as MP for West Looe.  A few weeks after Parliament began in 1621, Finch also succeeded as Recorder of London following the death of Robert Shute.  He held this post until his death in 1631.

Between 1621 and 1624 Parliaments, Finch's legal career prospered. After serving as summer reader at the Inner Temple in 1622, he was knighted and made a serjeant. He was knighted on 22 June 1623 and became sergeant-at-law.

As Recorder of London, he enjoyed an almost automatic right to represent the City and was not dependent upon the duchy of Cornwall for a seat in Parliament. Therefore, he was elected for City of London in 1624, serving until the formal dissolution of Parliament.  After Charles I became King, he was re-elected MP for the City of London in 1625 and in 1626 and was chosen to serve as Speaker of the House for his last term in 1626.

Personal life
Finch was twice married. Finch was first married to Frances Bell (d. 1627) sometime after 1607. Frances was a daughter of Sir Edmond Bell of Beaupre Hall, Norfolk. Together, they were the parents of three sons and one daughter, including: 

 Heneage Finch, 1st Earl of Nottingham (1620–1682), who married Elizabeth Harvey, a niece of Dr. William Harvey.
 Francis Finch (1623–1679), who married the widowed Elizabeth Parkhurst, daughter of Sir Robert Parkhurst.
 Elizabeth Finch (b. 1625), who married Edward Maddison (1594–1672), a son of Sir Ralph Maddison.
 John Finch (b. 1627)

On 16 April 1629, Sir Heneage was married to Elizabeth (née Cradock) Bennett (d. 1661). Elizabeth, a daughter of William Cradock, was the widow of Richard Bennett (d. 1628), a wealthy London merchant. Together, Lady Finch and Sir Heneage were the parents of several children, including:

 Frances Finch (b. 1630), who married Sir Clifford Clifton MP.
 Anne Finch (1631–1679), a philosopher in the tradition of the Cambridge Platonists and an influence on Leibniz who married Edward Conway, Viscount Conway (later 1st Earl of Conway).

After a lengthy illness, Sir Heneage died on 5 December 1631, at the age of 51, and was buried at Ravenstone, Buckinghamshire. His widow died in 1661.

References

External links
 Heneage Finch, Speaker in First Parliament of Charles I, by John Hoskins, -1630.
 Sir Heneage Finch (1580-1631), Speaker of the House of Commons at the National Portrait Gallery, London.
 

1580 births
1631 deaths
Members of the Parliament of England for West Looe
Speakers of the House of Commons of England
Younger sons of baronets
Younger sons of earls
Heneage
17th-century English lawyers
Members of the Parliament of England for the City of London
English MPs 1604–1611
English MPs 1621–1622
English MPs 1624–1625
English MPs 1625
English MPs 1626
Recorders of London
Heneage
Knights Bachelor
English knights